Cosmin Andrei Vâtcă (born 12 May 1982), is a Romanian footballer who plays as a goalkeeper.

Club career
Vâtcă began his career in his home town of Turda at CSS Turda. The first important club for which he played was FC Bihor. He made his debut in Liga I (then Divizia A), on 2 May 2004, in a match against Steaua București. He signed for €12,000 with Oțelul Galați in January 2006. The first match he played for Oțelul Galați was the shocking 3–0 away win against Dinamo București.

He has the reputation of a good goalkeeper, with very good reflexes who sometimes makes mistakes. In the 2006–2007 season, he made 33 appearances in Liga I for Oțelul Galați, having conceded 54 goals. He joined Steaua București in the summer of 2007 for €550,000, but he did not play in any matches during the 2007/2008 season of Liga I. He played in two Romanian Cup matches, against FCM Bacău (4-0) and Unirea Urziceni (0-2).

Oțelul Galați wanted to sign him back after the competitional break started. Oțelul Galați's goalkeepers, Ismail Kouha, Paulius Grybauskas and Valentin Borș have had some bad evolutions, which made the team's board to turn their attention to Vâtcă. But, the team's president, Marius Stan, dismissed all speculation and said that Oţelul would not buy back Vâtcă. After his contract with Steaua ended, he signed with Gaz Metan Mediaș as a free agent.

In January 2012, he signed a contract for three years with Rapid București.

Honours

Club
CFR Cluj
Liga I: 2017–18, 2018–19, 2019–20
Cupa României: 2015–16
Supercupa României: 2018

Viitorul Șelimbăr
Liga III: 2020–21

References

External links
 
 

1982 births
Living people
People from Turda
Romanian footballers
Association football goalkeepers
ACS Sticla Arieșul Turda players
Liga I players
FC Bihor Oradea players
ASC Oțelul Galați players
FC Steaua București players
FC Steaua II București players
CS Gaz Metan Mediaș players
FC Rapid București players
FC Viitorul Constanța players
CFR Cluj players
FC Voluntari players
FC Universitatea Cluj players
CSC 1599 Șelimbăr players